Junk Food Flip is an American cooking-themed television series that aired on Cooking Channel. The series was presented by chef Bobby Deen as well as chef Nikki Dinki, who was a contestant on the ninth season of the Food Network series Food Network Star. The series featured the chefs visiting restaurants to eat high-calorie guilty pleasure foods and later challenging the restaurant owners with similar, lower-calorie versions of the foods.

Episodes

References

External links
 
 
 Lion Television . Home

2010s American cooking television series
2014 American television series debuts
2016 American television series endings
Cooking Channel original programming
English-language television shows
Food reality television series